Antiville is a townland of 165 acres in County Antrim, Northern Ireland. It is situated in the civil parish of Larne and the historic barony of Glenarm Upper.

Archaeology
At Antiville, in a marshy area beside a tributary of the River Larne, a rectangular house and souterrain were discovered enclosed by a shallow ditch cut through the peat with a slight bank on the inner side. Eventually this was interpreted, not as a ringfort enclosure, but a means of draining excess water from the site. Radiocarbon dates from the supposed ringfort at Antiville  were 544-644 AD and 695-936 AD.

See also 
List of townlands in County Antrim

References

Townlands of County Antrim
Civil parish of Larne
Archaeological sites in County Antrim